"Rain on Me" is a song by R&B singer Ashanti, released in August 2003 as a single from her second album Chapter II. It contains a sample of "The Look of Love" by Isaac Hayes that was used on Snoop Dogg's song "G'z Up Hoes Down", a track that was removed from his debut album Doggystyle for sample clearance issues (and later cleared for the compilation album 15 Years on Death Row).

"Rain on Me" reached number seven on the US Billboard Hot 100 chart and the top 20 in the United Kingdom. In 2004, the song earned Ashanti a Grammy nomination for Best Female R&B Vocal Performance. The song's music video was released on August 28, 2003, and features Ashanti playing a superstar abused by a jealous boyfriend, played by actor Larenz Tate. The rap remix found on the Collectibles by Ashanti album interpolates "Can I Live" by rapper Jay-Z, which also samples the same Hayes song (and also produced by Irv Gotti). The remix also features Hussein Fatal and fellow The Inc. Records labelmates Charli "Chuck" Baltimore and Ja Rule.

Lyrics and music video
Ashanti's lyrics for "Rain on Me" address the pains and challenges of facing, and eventually overcoming, an abusive relationship. Wanting to make a cinematic and narrative-driven video for the song, she worked with LidRock and director Hype Williams to produce the clip. Ashanti explained: "We wanted to make a short movie that was 'real' — that showed that no matter if you're rich or poor, black or white, famous or not, domestic violence can touch your life."

The abusive boyfriend was played by actor Larenz Tate, best known for starring in Dead Presidents, a film which also features "The Look of Love" by Isaac Hayes. In the video, Ashanti and Tate (playing her boyfriend André) are shown in a relationship together while close-up scenes of her bruised face and glimpses of the two of them fighting appear throughout. Towards the climax, Tate is caught cheating on Ashanti with another girl as she tells him to leave. After a last confrontation, Ashanti ends the relationship as sounds of rain and thunder are heard gradually increasing leaving André behind. In the mini-movie version, we see Tate driving in a car as previous scenes are shown before he is hit by a truck and killed.

There are three versions of the video: one where the song begins at the start with the video's end showing Ashanti still sitting in a limo looking out of the window; the second with Ashanti singing in the rain wearing a yellow dress as scenes from the first video play in between, and the third (the mini-movie), which has more dialogue spoken by Ashanti and Tate themselves.

LidRock and the Family Violence Prevention Fund
Ashanti partnered with LidRock and the San Francisco-based Family Violence Prevention Fund (FVPF) to raise awareness of domestic violence during National Domestic Violence Awareness Month and to help distribute the mini-movie, which was also shown on MTV, BET, and other music video programs. Proceeds from sales of the LidRock discs were put toward the FVPF.

Esta Soler, founder and president of the Family Violence Prevention Fund said: "When we heard 'Rain on Me' and saw the Ashanti LidRock mini movie, we knew the powerful messages about violence that they artfully convey would speak to a lot of people. Ashanti wrote an amazing song that, by itself, has incredible power and emotional resonance. The LidRock minimovie just enhances the song's power, as it realistically portrays the complexity of domestic violence and the characters' inspiring strength in addressing the situation."

Additionally, a public service announcement about domestic violence featuring Ashanti was aired nationwide on October 17, 2003, on more than 4,000 screens at Regal Cinemas, United Artists Theatres, Edwards Theatres, and Hoyts Cinemas.

Charts

Weekly charts

Year-end charts

Release history

References

2000s ballads
2003 singles
2003 songs
Ashanti (singer) songs
Contemporary R&B ballads
Music videos directed by Hype Williams
Songs about domestic violence
Songs with lyrics by Hal David
Songs with music by Burt Bacharach
Songs written by Ashanti (singer)
Songs written by Chink Santana
Songs written by Irv Gotti